The trade relationship of the United States with Canada is the largest in the world. In 2016, the goods and services trade between the two countries totalled $627.8 billion. U.S. exports were $320.1 billion, while imports were $307.6 billion. The United States has a $12.5 billion trade surplus with Canada in 2016. Canada has historically held a trade deficit with the United States in every year since 1985 in net trade of goods, excluding services. The trade relationship between the two countries crosses all industries and is vitally important to both nations' success as each country is one of the largest trade partners of the other.

The trade across Ambassador Bridge, between Windsor, Ontario and Detroit, Michigan, alone is equal to all trade between the United States and Japan.

Before NAFTA
Canadian politicians have debated free trade since 1866.. Trade with the United States was the main topic in the 1911 Canadian Federal Election, where it was proposed by the Liberal Party of Canada and opposed by the Conservative Party, as well as in the 1984 and 1988 Canadian Federal Election, where the Progressive Conservative Party promoted a free trade agreement, opposed by the Liberal Party. Although there were many bilateral agreements reducing tariffs, a free trade agreement was not reached until the Canada–United States Free Trade Agreement in 1987.

North American Free Trade Agreement (NAFTA)

The Canada–United States Free Trade Agreement laid the groundwork for a multilateral and multicultural agreement between the United States, Mexico, and Canada, called the North American Free Trade Agreement (NAFTA), which has helped to increase trade amongst all three member countries. Although there is some dysfunction between the countries, especially in the area of automobiles and agriculture, the trends are negligible as the agreement has arguably been a boon for all nations involved.

Disputes
There are several disputes arising from the bilateral trade between the two nations. The United States placed Canada on its Special 301 Report intellectual property rights enforcement (although under the mildest category of "rebuke"). Other products from Canada under dispute include softwood lumber, beef, tomatoes, and other agricultural products.

The heightened border security as a result of the 2001 terrorist attacks has been an issue of concern for businesses in both countries. The issue has become less of a concern since the attacks with the development of new technology, registration, training, and fewer rules. However, a midpoint estimate of US$10.5 billion costs to businesses in delays and uncertain travel time have affected trade.

One ongoing and complex trade issue involves the importation of cheaper prescription drugs from Canada to the United States. Due to the Canadian government's price controls as part of their Single-payer medical system, prices for prescription drugs can be a fraction of the price paid by consumers in the unregulated U.S. market. While laws in the United States have been passed at the national level against such sales, specific state and local governments have passed their own legislation to allow the trade to continue.

Softwood lumber 

The Canada–United States softwood lumber dispute is one of the most significant and enduring trade disputes in modern history. The dispute has had its biggest effect on British Columbia, the major Canadian exporter of softwood lumber to the United States.

The heart of the dispute is the claim that the Canadian lumber industry is unfairly subsidized by the federal and provincial governments. Specifically, most timber in Canada is owned by provincial governments. The price charged to harvest the timber (the "stumpage fee") is set administratively rather than through a competitive auction, as is often the practice in the United States. The United States claims that the provision of government timber at below market prices constitutes an unfair subsidy. Under U.S. trade remedy laws, foreign goods benefiting from subsidies can be subject to a countervailing duty tariff to offset the subsidy and bring the price of the product back up to market rates.

Proposals
Since the September 11th attacks, there has been a debate on whether there should be further North American integration. Some have proposed the adoption of the Amero under the North American Currency Union as the official currency of North America. While these discussions are more prevalent in Canada, studies have shown that United States citizens would not object to economic integration. Former U.S. Ambassador Paul Cellucci stated, however, "Security trumps trade" in the United States, and so as long as Canada is a possible point of entry for terrorists, such integration seems unfeasible.

By sector

Energy 

The strength of the Canada–U.S. relationship is demonstrated by impressive bilateral trade of approximately $1.9 billion a day, along the world's longest undefended border. Energy trade is the largest component of this cross-border commerce. Canada has the third-largest oil reserves (after Saudi Arabia and Venezuela), thanks to its oil-sands resources. The United States has historically been Canada's only foreign market for natural gas, oil, and hydropower. In 2010, almost 100% of Canada's exports in these commodity classes were destined for the United States. Canada is the largest foreign supplier of crude oil (25% of oil imports) and natural gas to the United States. In short, this energy relationship has enhanced U.S. energy security and provided Canada with a steady demand for its energy exports.

However, this highly integrated U.S.–Canada energy relationship may change dramatically in the near future. U.S. oil and natural gas production and reserves are expanding because of growing tight oil and shale gas developments. Furthermore, the U.S. Energy Information Administration (EIA) forecasts slower growth in U.S. oil and natural gas consumption in the coming decades until 2035. Consequently, the United States no longer appears to be an unlimited market for Canadian energy, leaving Canada seeking new export destinations.

Both Canada and the United States are increasingly reliant on foreign investment to develop their resource sectors, with Asia serving as an important source of capital. Asian investors initially focused on project investments as minority joint venture partners but are showing increasing interest in owning production companies. Asian investors' objectives for investing in the North American energy sector include both attractive financial returns on investment as well as an interest in North America as an energy supply source for their economies. The expanding energy investment and trade between North America and Asia can be mutually beneficial.

Agriculture (Dairy) 
Another source of tension has been Canada's protection of their dairy farmers. Canada is the only industrialized country in the world to still use a "supply management system" for regulating the supply of dairy products. The US sees the system as protectionist because after an annual import quota has been reached, a large tariff (240% for milk, 300% for butter) is applied to any additional imports.

Media and culture 

Because English is the majority language in both countries, and accents and dialects on both sides of the border are (relatively) similar and is a variety of North American English (as compared to the British or Australian English), both high culture and mass media are easily traded. Both countries have minority-language media—Canada's large francophone population and the United States' large hispanophone population—as well as immigrants and indigenous language speakers, but cultural trade mostly concerns English-language media.

The major difference is that the U.S. media market is more than 15 times larger, meaning that the Americans enjoy greater economies of scale. Historically, this has always been the case since the 19th century, when Canada was flooded with American books, but the beginning of Canada's cultural protectionism dates to the 1920s, when Canada's radio market was dominated by American broadcasts, leading cultural nationalists to form the Canadian Radio League, which lobbied for a publicly funded broadcaster to compete with U.S. stations. In the 1950s, television experienced a similar dispute, with Canadian stations airing U.S. programming and U.S. stations broadcasting into Canada, leading to the creation of CBC Television. Since the 1970s, Canadian radio and television stations have been required by law to air a minimum percentage of Canadian content.

One source of tension is a difference in philosophy: the Canadian position is that its culture is a prerequisite for safeguarding its nationhood and should thus be excluded from free trade agreements, whereas Americans negotiators see media as just another commodity. This difference came to light during the dispute over "split-run" magazine during the 1990s. Split-runs are magazines produce a slightly modified edition (say, for a Canadian market) and resell much of the advertising space to Canadian advertisers. Canadian publishers argued that the Americans were poaching all their advertising revenue without producing substantial Canadian content. American publishers and the U.S. government countered that banning "split-runs" was illegal under international trade law. There have also been disputes over the generous tax credits that the Canadian federal and provincial governments give to television and film productions. This, combined with a weaker Canadian dollar caused American filmmakers to complain during the 1990s that "runaway productions" were hurting American employment in the film industry, especially in California.

See also
 NAFTA's effect on United States employment
 North American Forum on Integration
 North American SuperCorridor Coalition
 Security and Prosperity Partnership of North America

References

 
Foreign trade of the United States
Foreign trade of Canada